Saad Abdul-Majid (1944 –  15 April 2021) was an Iraqi politician and diplomat, and one of the most prominent Iraqi leaders during the Baath Party regime. He was one of the officers who led the military coup in 1968 that brought the Baath Party to power.

After the 2003 invasion
The American occupation forces put him on the list of the 55 most wanted Iraqis, as he held several positions, most of them in the diplomatic corps and party work. In the national leadership, director of the office of the secretariat of the National Command, and head of the Expatriates Authority.

His last position was the official of the Baath Party office in Salah al-Din Governorate. He was arrested on May 24, 2003, released on December 18, 2005, and he left Iraq after his release.

Death
He passed away on 15 April 2021.

References

External links

1944 births
2021 deaths
20th-century Iraqi politicians
21st-century Iraqi politicians
Members of the Regional Command of the Arab Socialist Ba'ath Party – Iraq Region
People from Baghdad
Most-wanted Iraqi playing cards
Iraq War prisoners of war
Iraqi prisoners of war